{{Infobox religious text
| image = 
| name=Āpta-mīmāṁsā
| alt = Ācārya Samantabhadra’s Āptamīmāṁsā (Devāgamastotra)
| caption = English translation of the Aptamimamsa (Devāgamastotra)"
| religion = Jainism
| author = Acharya Samantabhadra
| language = Sanskrit
| period = 2nd Century CE
}}Aptamimamsa (also Devāgamastotra) is a Jain text composed by Acharya Samantabhadra, a Jain acharya said to have lived about the latter part of the second century A.D. Āptamīmāṁsā is a treatise of 114 verses which discusses the Jaina view of Reality, starting with the concept of omniscience (Kevala Jnana) and the attributes of the Omniscient.

 Content 
The English translation of the first verse is:

In Verse 91 acharya asserts that both fate and human-effort are jointly responsible for desirable and undesirable effects.

In Verse 98 acharya propounds that bondage (bandha) is caused due to ignorance 'accompanied' by delusion (moha), and bondage is not caused due to ignorance 'not accompanied' by delusion (moha).

 Jaina Logic 
Two important concepts, particular to the Jaina logic, are that of syādvāda and anekāntavāda. These have been discussed comprehensively in Aptamimamsa.

 Syādvāda

Syādvāda is the doctrine of conditional predications. Highlighting the indispensability of syādvāda, Āchārya Samantabhadra asserts:
According to the Jains, Syādvāda and kevalajñāna (omniscience) are the foundational facts of knowledge. In this regard, Āchārya Samantabhadra writes:

 Anekāntavāda Anekāntavāda means non-absolutism. In Jainism, a thing is supposed to have infinite-fold characteristics or properties. Therefore, the basic thesis in Jainism is the non-one-sided (anekānta'') nature of reality. According to Āchārya Samantabhadra:

References

Sources 

Jain texts